The Staatsorchester Stuttgart (Stuttgart State Orchestra; full name, Württembergisches Staatsorchester oder Orchester der Württembergischen Staatstheater) is a German symphony orchestra based in Stuttgart.  The orchestra is resident at the Staatstheater Stuttgart, where it performs for productions of the Staatsoper Stuttgart and the Stuttgart Ballet, and regularly gives concerts at the Liederhalle (Beethovensaal).

History
The historical roots of the orchestra trace back to the Württembergische Hofkapelle.  The orchestra celebrated its 425th anniversary in 2018. 

In 2002, the orchestra was awarded as "Orchestra of the year" based on a poll of the magazine Opernwelt.

The current Generalmusikdirektor (GMD) of the orchestra is Cornelius Meister, since 2018, appointed with an initial contract of six seasons.  In October 2022, the orchestra announced the extension of Meister's contract as GMD through 2026.

Music directors (GMD)
 1918–1922: Fritz Busch
 1922–1937: Carl Leonhardt
 1937–1942: Herbert Albert
 1947–1969: Ferdinand Leitner
 1970–1972: Václav Neumann
 1972–1980: Silvio Varviso
 1980–1987: Dennis Russell Davies
 1987–1991: Luis Antonio García Navarro
 1992–1997: Gabriele Ferro
 1997–2006: Lothar Zagrosek
 2007–2011: Manfred Honeck
 2012–2018: Sylvain Cambreling
 2018–present: Cornelius Meister

References

External links
 

German symphony orchestras
Württemberg